Hickory Township is one of twenty-one current townships in Carroll County, Arkansas, USA. As of the 2010 census, its total population was 4,977.

Geography

Cities, towns, villages, and CDPs
Green Forest

References
 United States Census Bureau 2008 TIGER/Line Shapefiles
 United States Board on Geographic Names (GNIS)
 United States National Atlas

 Census 2010 U.S. Gazetteer Files: County Subdivisions in Arkansas

External links
 US-Counties.com
 City-Data.com

Townships in Carroll County, Arkansas
Townships in Arkansas